Tiga Dara (Indonesian for Three Maidens) is a 1957 Indonesian musical comedy film starring Chitra Dewi, Mieke Wijaya, and Indriati Iskak. Directed by Usmar Ismail for Perfini, the film follows three sisters who live with their father and grandmother. When the eldest sister, Nunung, shows no interest in marrying, her family tries unsuccessfully to find a husband for her. Nunung initially rejects the advances of a young man named Toto, who instead dates her younger sister. However, when he becomes jealous and travels from Jakarta to Bandung to profess his love, she agrees to marry him.

Produced using government credit and written in an attempt to cover Perfini's outstanding debts, Tiga Dara was intended to be commercial despite Ismail's disapproval of such works. After it was released on 24 August 1957, the film was an immense popular success, launching the careers of its stars, earning the highest box office returns of any Perfini film, and being screened in first-class cinemas. However, even though Tiga Dara was shown at the 1959 Venice Film Festival and received Best Musical Arrangement at the 1960 Indonesian Film Week, Ismail considered it a compromise of his initial vision for Perfini.

Since its release, Tiga Dara has been considered a classic of Indonesian cinema, with themes which remain relevant for modern Indonesian society. It was remade as Tiga Dara Mencari Cinta (Three Maidens Seek Love) in 1980 by Djun Saptohadi and influenced Teguh Karya's Pacar Ketinggalan Kereta (Lover Left by the Train, 1989). A second remake, Ini Kisah Tiga Dara (This Is the Tale of the Three Maidens), was produced by Nia Dinata and released in September 2016. In 2015 Tiga Dara was restored and converted to 4K digital by L'immagine Ritrovata Laboratory.

Plot
Three sisters—Nunung (Chitra Dewi), Nana (Mieke Wijaya) and Nenny (Indriati Iskak)—are being raised by their grandmother (Fifi Young) in Jakarta after their mother's death. Though the sisters' father Sukandar lives with them, he is too involved in his own work to pay them heed.

While the sisters are out with Nana's boyfriend Herman, their grandmother tells Sukandar than she will not live to see Nunung, already aged 29, marry. He agrees to invite his colleagues to the house. When they come several days later, Nunung impresses all present with her piano-playing and singing. However, the men are all too old, and Nunung's grandmother insists that Sukandar find a younger man. Nenny, overhearing the conversation, suggests that they hold a party; this too is a failure, as Nunung takes no interest in the festivities.

Nana is then asked to take Nunung out with her, in the hopes that the eldest sister will meet a marriageable young man. At a party, while Nana mingles with several men, Nunung sits out every dance and eventually leaves with Herman. Asked why she has returned home, Nunung tells her grandmother that she felt too old among the younger party-goers and asks why she was told to go. Nenny, again eavesdropping, shouts out that their grandmother is hoping to find her a husband. Though Nunung is initially angered, she understands her grandmother's intentions.

The following day, Nunung is stricken by a scooter driven by Toto (Rendra Karno). Despite an injured leg, Nunung insists on taking a pedicab home; without her knowledge, Toto follows her. He later returns to apologize, and, though Nunung treats him harshly, is quickly accepted by Nana and her grandmother. Nana asks Toto to visit frequently, and over the next several days Nana pushes away Herman. Nenny, meanwhile, uses her sister's interest in Toto to become closer to Herman. When Nana announces that she and Toto are engaged, her grandmother is furious; if Nana marries before her sister, she says, Nunung will never marry.

After Nana and Nunung fight, their guardians decide that it is best for Nunung to go the home of her uncle Tamsil (Usmar Ismail) in Bandung and rest. While there, Nunung writes a letter to her father that Joni kisses her goodnight every day. This news sparks Nenny's titillation and Toto's jealousy. Nana insists that Toto choose between her and Nunung; Toto decides to go to Bandung and protest Joni's impropriety. He confronts Nunung and confesses his love for her. She spitefully tells him that she sleeps in the same room as Joni every night.

Herman, at the insistence of Nana, takes the remainder of the family to Bandung, where they meet up with Toto, Nunung, and Tamsil's family. As Tamsil introduces his sons, Joni is revealed to be a young child. Nunung and Toto embrace, while Nana and Herman make up.

Production

Tiga Dara was directed and produced by Usmar Ismail for his National Film Company (Perusahaan Film Nasional, better known as Perfini). Although Ismail had wanted to "not consider commercial aspects" of filmmaking when he established Perfini in 1950, he was forced to recognise the need to make a profitable film as Perfini continued to lose money. Following the failures of Lagi-Lagi Krisis (More Crises, 1955) and Tamu Agung (Exalted Guest, 1955), the company's financial situation was bleak, and Ismail fired a number of his staff. With only some leftover government credit to finance his next production, Ismail collaborated with M. Alwi Dahlan to write a film which would be popular with audiences. The resulting story, which may have been inspired by the 1936 musical comedy Three Smart Girls, was Tiga Dara.

Production of Tiga Dara began in March 1956. Chitra Dewi, Mieke Wijaya, and Indriati Iskak were cast as the titular maidens. Dewi had previously appeared in Tamu Agung, and Wijaya had made her debut in the Palembang Film Corporation's Gagal (Fail) the previous year. Iskak, the 14-year-old daughter of film director Raden Iskak, made her feature film debut with Tiga Dara. Supporting roles were filled by Fifi Young, Rendra Karno, Hassan Sanusi, Bambang Irawan, and Roosilawaty. For the role of Joni, Ismail cast his real-life son, Irwan Usmar Ismail.

As musical films were popular with Indonesian audiences, Tiga Dara was made in that genre. It featured seven songs by Saiful Bahri (who also served as sound editor) as well as one by Ismail Marzuki and two by Oetjin Noerhasjim. Only Wijaya provided her own vocals; the other actors were dubbed by Sam Saimun, Elly Sri Kudus, Bing Slamet, Djuita, S. Effendy, and Sitti Nurochma. Long-time Perfini cameraman Max Tera handled cinematography for this black-and-white film, using the company's outdated equipment, and Soemardjono was in charge of editing.

Release and reception
Tiga Dara premiered on 24 August 1957 at the Capitol Theatre in Jakarta. Distributed by Perfini and advertised in part with trucks and megaphones, the film found popular success. It was screened for eight consecutive weeks in cinemas throughout the archipelago, including several first-class cinemas affiliated with the American Motion Picture Association of Indonesia (AMPAI) which mostly showed imported films. On 20 September 1957, President Sukarno arranged for a private screening of Tiga Dara at the Presidential Palace in Bogor for the birthday of his wife, . The film was also commonly screened at wedding parties. "Tiga Dara" competitions between groups of three sisters were held in much of Java, and the term became widely used as the name of batik products, shops, and drinks. At the 1960 Indonesian Film Week, Tiga Dara received Best Musical Arrangement.

Negotiations to bring Tiga Dara to Malaya began soon after its release, and the film was exported, again to commercial success, in exchange for the import of the Malayan film Mega Mendung (Cloudy Skies). In the late 1950s the film was shown in several Italian cities, including Rome, as well as in Yugoslavia. After Floris Ammannati, director of the 1959 Venice Film Festival, saw the Rome screening, he invited Ismail to show Tiga Dara in Venice. Ismail did so, though he considered the screening to be unsuccessful. Tiga Dara was screening in Netherlands New Guinea by August 1960 and in Suriname by August 1963.

Impact
Tiga Dara was Perfini's most lucrative film, grossing almost Rp 10 million in ticket sales, or a profit of Rp 3,080,000, during its theatrical run. However, despite this popular success Perfini's financial situation saw little improvement. Furthermore, Ismail considered the Tiga Dara a disappointment that compromised the goals he had had when he established Perfini. According to fellow Perfini film director D. Djajakusuma:

In subsequent years Perfini released a number of commercially oriented films, such as Delapan Pendjuru Angin (Eight Compass Directions, 1957) and Asrama Dara (Dormitory for Girls, 1958). Though none of these were commercial failures, none except for Asrama Dara approached the financial success of Tiga Dara. Ismail attempted to reassert himself as a director of quality not-for-profit films through Pedjuang (Warriors for Freedom, 1960), which was screened in competition at the 2nd Moscow International Film Festival in 1961. However, as the years passed he became increasingly distanced from his early goals and had made attempts to enter banking, the nightclub industry, and parliament by the time of his death in 1971.

Dewi and Wijaya both became popular following the success of Tiga Dara. Dewi continued acting for a further four decades, appearing in her final feature film, Pedang Ulung (Grand Sword), in 1993, fifteen years before her death. Wijaya, meanwhile, has continued acting through 2008's Ayat-Ayat Cinta (Verses of Love). Meanwhile, Iskak, who was praised for having a more naturalistic acting style than her stage-trained fellow actors, soared to popularity. She formed a girl group, the Baby Dolls, together with Rima Melati, and Baby Huwae, and acted in a further eight films before retiring from cinema in 1963.

Legacy
Tiga Dara has been recognised as a classic of Indonesian cinema and often been shown on television. A 1987 retrospective on Perfini in Tempo argued that the film still showed the sense of honesty and realism common in Ismail's earlier work, and, in a 1991 memorial book for Ismail, Rosihan Anwar wrote that the themes of Tiga Dara remained relevant for the Indonesian people. Similar sentiments were voiced by the film director Nia Dinata in 2016.

By 2015 the cellulose acetate negatives for Tiga Dara, held at Sinematek Indonesia, were heavily damaged. They were torn in places, and scenes were besmirched by fungus or lost altogether. To better preserve the film for future generations, SA Films arranged for Tiga Dara to be restored by the Bologna-based L'immagine Ritrovata Laboratory; the film was the second of Ismail's oeuvre to be restored, following Lewat Djam Malam (After the Curfew, 1954) in 2012. Restoration work, which included the reinsertion of lost scenes using extant copies of the film and the removal of dust and fungus, began in early 2015 and was completed on 8 October 2015. This restoration—converted to 4K digital—was screened Indonesia beginning on 11 August 2016, with a soundtrack album featuring covers by nine artists being launched on the same day. The Jakarta Post described the film as "a hit with audience members". A DVD and Blu-ray release was scheduled for 2017.

Several films have been remade or influenced by Tiga Dara. A remake, Tiga Dara Mencari Cinta (Three Maidens Seek Love), was directed by Djun Saptohadi and released in 1980. This comedy starred Ingrid Fernandez, Nana Riwayatie, and Winny Aditya Dewi as three sisters who live with their father and face the trials and tribulations of dating. Eight years later, when Teguh Karya was directing Pacar Ketinggalan Kereta (Lover Left by the Train, 1989), he insisted that the cast and crew watch Tiga Dara in an attempt to transcend it. In Tempo, the writer Putu Wijaya later described Pacar Ketinggalan Kereta as seemingly trying to recapture the family and musical dynamics of Ismail's story. In 2004 a remake of Tiga Dara, to be directed by Rudi Soedjarwo and involve Dian Sastrowardoyo, Siti Nurhaliza, and Krisdayanti, was announced, though this production has not been realized.

Another updated retelling of the Tiga Dara story, Ini Kisah Tiga Dara (This is the Story of Three Maidens), was shot between 23 February and 27 March 2016 in Maumere, Flores. In a press conference, the film's director, Nia Dinata, stated that she had enjoyed watching Tiga Dara as a child and that she remained awed by the film's beauty. She also said that her retelling, though it was inspired by and maintained the spirit of Ismail's original, featured a new plot as well as new songs by Titiek Puspa: the film follows three sisters who move to Maumere, Flores, to help their father manage a hotel. Ini Kisah Tiga Dara, which stars , Tara Basro, and Tatyana Akman, was released on 1 September 2016.

Explanatory notes

References

Works cited

 

 

1957 musical comedy films
1957 films
Indonesian black-and-white films
Films directed by Usmar Ismail